Stratiotes is a genus of beetles in the family Carabidae, containing the following species:

 Stratiotes batesi Putzeys, 1866
 Stratiotes clivinoides (Laporte, 1832)
 Stratiotes iracundus Putzeys, 1861

References

Scaritinae